Sir John Boothman Stuttard KStJ JP FCA (born 6 February 1945) is an English chartered accountant who was Lord Mayor of the City of London in 2006-07.

Early life
Stuttard was born at Burnley, Lancashire, and educated at Shrewsbury School before going up to Churchill College, Cambridge (MA).

Career
Stuttard joined Cooper Brothers in 1967, qualifying as a chartered accountant in 1970 and becoming a Fellow of the Institute of Chartered Accountants in England & Wales. He was a Partner in PricewaterhouseCoopers from 1975 to 2005 and has been an adviser to the firm since then (including being Deputy Chairman of the Advisory Board). From 1981, he spent two years on secondment to HM Cabinet Office advising the Central Policy Review Staff on nationalized industries and their privatisation. From 1983 to 1994 he was chairman of the firm's Scandinavian group. He spent five years in China from 1994 to 1999 as PWC executive chairman.

In 2005 he was elected as Aldermanic Sheriff and in 2006 as Lord Mayor of London.

Sir John's charitable, business activities and public appointments have included:
 Voluntary Service Overseas, Teacher with at SOAS College, Brunei (1966–67);
 New Horizon Youth Centre in London’s West End, Honorary Treasurer (1972–77);
 Cambridge University Appointments Board, Board Member, advising the Cambridge University Careers Service (1977–81);
 Totteridge Manor Association, an environmental charity, Director (1980–2005), Treasurer (1980–94) and Chairman (2002–05);
 China-Britain Business Council Director, (2000–06);
 VSO Member, Fund Raising Advisory Board (2000–05), Council Member (2006–11), Honorary Vice-President (2011-);
 Advisory Committee of the East Asia Institute of the Faculty of Oriental Studies at Cambridge University Member, (2001-);
 Finnish-British Chamber of Commerce, Director (2001–06), Chairman (2002–06), and Life President (2007-), ;
 Justice of the Peace (2001-);
 City of London: Alderman for Lime Street (2001–13), Sheriff (2005–06), Lord Mayor (2006–07);
 Bridewell Royal Hospital Court Member and Fellow, (2002–13);
 King Edward's School, Witley Governor, (2002–13);
 Guild of Educators, "Sponsoring Alderman", (2002–13);
 The Mayor of London’s Disaster Relief Appeal, Trustee, (2002–13);
 Charities Aid Foundation, Trustee, (2003–06 and 2007–08) and Chairman, Audit, Risk and Compliance Committee (2003–06);
 City of London Archaeological Trust, Trustee, (2003–11);
 St Paul's Cathedral Foundation - Advisor (2005–11), Trustee and Chairman (2011–13);
 Morden College, Greenwich, an old-people’s home, Trustee, (2005-2020);
 Totteridge Residents Association, Vice-President, (2006–13);
 The Lord Mayor’s 800th Anniversary Appeal "to help young people travel", Trustee, (2005–13);
 Admiral of the Port of London (2006–07);
 City University Chancellor, (2006–07);
 HM Lieutenancy of London (2006–13);
 London and Greater London Merchant Navy Association, President (2007-)
 He is an Honorary Fellow of the Foreign Policy Association, New York (2000), Honorary Doctor of Letters, City University (2006), an Honorary Fellow, Securities & Investment Institute (2007), and an Honorary Member of the Association of Chartered Certified Accountants (2008);
 Livery companies: Worshipful Company of Glaziers and Painters of Glass - Master (2009); the Worshipful Company of Chartered Accountants in England and Wales - Master (2011); the Worshipful Company of Educators - Master (2013), and the Worshipful Company of Plumbers.
 Kazakh-British Trade & Industry Council, Co-Chair (2009–13)
 Churchill College, Cambridge - By-Fellow of the Moller Centre (2008–14), Patron of the Churchill Archives Centre (2015-)
 Shaftesbury Civic Society, Hon President (2013-2021)
 Shaftesbury & District Historical Society, Hon President (2019-)
 Author of ten books The New Silk Road – Secrets of Business Success in China Today published by John Wiley (2000) and Whittington to World Financial Centre - The City of London and its Lord Mayor by Phillimore & Co (2008), Travels in a Lifetime by John Stuttard (2015), A History of British McCalls by John Stuttard (2016), editor of The Worshipful Company of Chartered Accountants in England and Wales: The First Forty Years by WCCAEW (2017) and 'The Turbulent Quaker of Shaftesbury' by Hobnob Press (2018), The 20-Ghost Club: The Oldest Rolls-Royce Club in the World, 1949-2019 (2019), By Rolls-Royce Silver Ghost to the Isle of Skye in 1920 (2021), Pre-War Rolls-Royce Motor Cars with a Finnish connection (2021), Russia and Rolls-Royce – The First 25 Years (2021)

Honours and awards
 He was appointed a Knight Bachelor in the 2008 New Year Honours;
 He was appointed a Knight of Justice of the Order of St John (2006) and a Companion of the League of Mercy Foundation (2007);
 He was awarded Commander of the Order of the Lion of Finland by the Government of Finland (2004), and is a recipient of the Silver Medal of Helsinki;
 He received the Coronation Medal from the Sultan of Selangor (2001);
 He received the 20th Anniversary Jubilee Medal from the President of Kazakhstan (2011).

References

Notes

External links 
 Debrett's People of Today

1945 births
Living people
People from Burnley
People educated at Shrewsbury School
Alumni of Churchill College, Cambridge
Knights Bachelor
Commanders of the Order of the Lion of Finland
Knights of Justice of the Order of St John
Sheriffs of the City of London
21st-century lord mayors of London
21st-century British politicians
English justices of the peace